Udom Ratsamelongkorn (born 3 November 1944) is a Thai judoka. He competed in the men's lightweight event at the 1964 Summer Olympics.

References

External links
 

1944 births
Living people
Udom Ratsamelongkorn
Udom Ratsamelongkorn
Judoka at the 1964 Summer Olympics
Place of birth missing (living people)
Udom Ratsamelongkorn